Teresita "Ging" Quintos Deles is a Filipina feminist, peace advocate, and government official best known for having been the Philippine government's Presidential Adviser on the Peace Process (OPAPP) from 2003–2005 and 2010 to 2016.

Deles began her career as a teacher. She then became an advocate for women's rights and worked on addressing poverty issues. In 2003 she became the first woman appointed as Presidential Adviser on the Peace Process, although Haydee Yorac had served in OPAPP's predecessor, the National Unification Council.

Deles served as Presidential Adviser on the Peace Process through 2005 and again from 2010 through 2016. While she was serving in that capacity, the Comprehensive Agreement on the Bangsamoro (CAB) was signed in 2014.

Deles has been active in several non-governmental organizations including the ASEAN Institute for Peace and Reconciliation (AIPR), the Coalition for Peace, the Standby Mediation Team under the UN Department of Public Affairs, and the Center on Innovation Transformation and Excellence in Governance (INCITEGov).

In 2012 Deles was the recipient of the N-Peace Award as a role model for peace .

See also 
 Marvic Leonen
 Office of the Presidential Adviser on the Peace Process

References

External links
 Teresita Quintos Deles wins the N-Peace Award 2012: the Philippines

Filipino feminists
Filipino activists
Nonviolence advocates
Living people
Year of birth missing (living people)